Otherkin were an Irish garage rock band from Dublin active between 2014 and 2019. Noted for their "incendiary" live shows, they supported Guns N' Roses at Slane Castle in 2017.

Career
Otherkin were founded in 2014; they cited The Clash, Queens of the Stone Age, The Ramones and Blur as influences. Their first album, OK, was released in 2017; it was nominated for the Choice Music Prize. They broke up in 2019.

Personnel

 Luke Reilly (vocals, guitar)
 Conor Andrew Wynne (lead guitar)
 David Anthony (bass guitar)
 Rob Summons (drums)

Discography

EPs
The 201 (2015)
The New Vice (2016)
Electric Dream (2019)

Studio albums
OK (2017)

Live albums
Deutschland KO (2018)

Gallery

References

External links 
Official site

Musical groups from Dublin (city)
Irish indie rock groups
2014 establishments in Ireland
2019 disestablishments in Ireland